Liu Yi-te (born 15 April 1960) is a Taiwanese politician. While affiliated with the Democratic Progressive Party, he was a member of the National Assembly between 1992 and 2000. He joined the Taiwan Solidarity Union upon its establishment in 2001, and since April 2016, has served as party chairman.

Early life and activism
Liu is of Mainland Chinese descent, and became active in the tangwai movement as a student. As Taiwan was then a one-party state led by the Kuomintang, Liu was slapped upon refusing to retract his comments about the politician in a written statement. Liu later met Lee Wen-chung and Lai Chin-lin at National Taiwan University, where he led a club advocating for Taiwan independence.

Political career
Liu ran in the December 1991 National Assembly elections and took office in 1992 as a representative of Taipei. He won reelection in 1996, and was named Democratic Progressive Party caucus leader. From this position, Liu worked with senior Kuomintang members of the National Assembly and passed a resolution to extend the term of the National Assembly while also reducing its membership by mandating that the next assembly election take place under a system of proportional representation. The passage of the resolution drew criticism from both the Kuomintang and Democratic Progressive Party headquarters. The Judicial Yuan ruled against the term extension in 2000, but Liu subsequently supported an initiative to postpone the election date of 6 May mandated by the Judicial Yuan. Liu later chastised members of the Judicial Yuan and worked with Kuomintang assembly delegates to remove the justices' lifetime stipend, though he refused to endorse abolition of the Judicial Yuan itself. Another vote on the fate of the National Assembly was taken in April 2000, in which Liu and Chen Chin-te of the DPP, as well as their KMT counterparts, agreed to end the National Assembly on 20 May 2000, passing many of its powers to the Legislative Yuan. After stepping down from the National Assembly, Liu was named director of the DPP's organizational development department.

By June of that year, Liu had been approached by a pro-Taiwan alliance that later became the Taiwan Solidarity Union, which Liu joined instead. He was named president of the Independence Evening Post in July 2001, shortly before the publication released its last issue in October.

Liu represented the Taiwan Solidarity Union in the 2004 legislative elections, but did not win. Afterwards, Liu became director of the TSU's organization department. In August 2005, Liu pushed the Democratic Progressive Party to rescind a mayoral nomination given to Wang Tuoh in Keelung, stating that if the DPP did not do so, Liu himself would enter the Chiayi mayoral contest to challenge the DPP. Liu did register as a Chiayi mayoral candidate, but withdrew when Wang did the same in Keelung. Liu again challenged the Democratic Progressive Party in 2007, contesting the legislative seat won by Yu Tian.

By 2007, Liu had become a deputy secretary-general of the TSU.  From this position, Liu helped the party deliver petitions to the Control Yuan and the judicial branch.  He also announced electoral strategy in 2011 and 2014. Liu defeated Chen Chien-ming in an April 2016 leadership election, and succeeded Lin Chih-chia, who was serving as acting chairman of the Taiwan Solidarity Union at the time.

References

1960 births
Living people
Politicians of the Republic of China on Taiwan from Chiayi
Taiwan Solidarity Union chairpersons
Democratic Progressive Party (Taiwan) politicians
National Taiwan University alumni